Yuliya Anatoliïvna Olishevska (Ukrainian: Юлія Анатоліївна Олішевська; born 2 February 1989) is a Ukrainian athlete who competes in the sprint with a personal best time of 51.68 seconds at the 400 metres event.

Olishevska won the gold medal at the 2012 European Athletics Championships in Helsinki at the 4×400 metres relay.

References

External links 
 

1989 births
Living people
People from Berdychiv
Ukrainian female sprinters
European Athletics Championships medalists
World Athletics Championships athletes for Ukraine
Olympic athletes of Ukraine
Athletes (track and field) at the 2016 Summer Olympics
Olympic female sprinters
Sportspeople from Zhytomyr Oblast